An antimycobacterial is a type of medication used to treat Mycobacteria infections.

Types include:
 Tuberculosis treatments
 Leprostatic agents

Notes

Antibiotics